Arthur Eugene Schott (July 14, 1913 – November 16, 1992) was an American Major League Baseball pitcher from 1935 to 1939, primarily for the Cincinnati Reds.

Born in Batavia, Ohio, Schott died in Sun City Center, Florida, in 1992, aged 79.

References

External links

Baseball Almanac statistics

1913 births
1992 deaths
Baseball players from Ohio
People from Batavia, Ohio
Major League Baseball pitchers
Philadelphia Phillies players
Cincinnati Reds players
Brooklyn Dodgers players
Peoria Tractors players
Cedar Rapids Bunnies players
Topeka Senators players
Toronto Maple Leafs (International League) players
Montreal Royals players